The Deccan Archaeological and Cultural Research Institute is a non-profit organisation operating in the Deccan region of India, registered under Act 2 of The Indian Trusts Act, 1882. It is dedicated to the conservation and preservation of India’s natural, cultural, living, tangible and intangible heritage.

History 
DACRI was founded in 2009 in Hyderabad  to promote historical and cultural research among the people of the Deccae. Since 2009, it has pioneered the conservation, protection and promotion of the cultural heritage and monumental grandeur of Deccan region.

In 2012, members of Deccan Archaeological and Cultural Research Institute (DACRI) and other archeologists and historians discovered a series of 20 megalithic burial cairn circles dating to 1000 BCE on a hillock in Madugala village in Mahbubnagar district, India. The team also discovered a huge Satavahana site in an extent of 100 acres datable to between the 1st century BCE to 2nd Century CE.

Publications 
Telaṅgāṇālō inumu, ukku pariśrama  by S Jaikishan; Deccan Archaeological and Cultural Research Institute, 2010
Siddhanāgārjununi Rasēndramaṅgaḷaṃ  by Nāgārjuna, Siddha.; Kurrā Jitēndrabābu; Deccan Archaeological and Cultural Research Institute, 2010.
Tragedy of Hyderabad  by Mir Laik Ali; Kurrā Jitēndrabābu; Deccan Archaeological and Cultural Research Institute, 2011.
Kaumudīmahotsavaḥ   Vijjikā; Mānavalli Rāmakr̥ṣṇakavi; S K Ramanatha Sastri; Deccan Archaeological and Cultural Research Institute, 2015.

References

Archaeological research institutes
Research institutes established in 2009
Research institutes in Hyderabad, India
2009 establishments in Andhra Pradesh